Yanislav Ivanov (born 6 March 1992) is a Bulgarian footballer who currently plays as a midfielder for Juventus Malchika. 

He previously played for Slavia Sofia, Spartak Pleven, Kaliakra, Bansko, Dunav Ruse, Vereya, Chernomorets Balchik and Kariana.

Career
In June 2018, Ivanov joined Chernomorets Balchik.

References

External links
 
 

1992 births
Living people
Bulgarian footballers
PFC Slavia Sofia players
PFC Spartak Pleven players
PFC Kaliakra Kavarna players
FC Bansko players
FC Dunav Ruse players
FC Vereya players
FC Kariana Erden players
FC Chernomorets Balchik players
First Professional Football League (Bulgaria) players
Second Professional Football League (Bulgaria) players
Association football midfielders
Sportspeople from Pleven